Lewis Charles Ayles (August 28, 1927 – October 21, 2009) was a Canadian politician. He served in the Legislative Assembly of New Brunswick as member of the Progressive Conservative party.

References

1927 births
2009 deaths